General elections were held in Antigua and Barbuda on 24 April 1980. They were won by the governing Antigua Labour Party. ALP leader Vere Bird was re-elected as Prime Minister of Antigua and Barbuda. Voter turnout was 77.1%.

They were the last elections before Antigua and Barbuda's independence as a Commonwealth realm in 1981.

Results

References

Elections in Antigua and Barbuda
Antigua
1980 in Antigua and Barbuda
April 1980 events in North America